The Deal (lit. "Murder Request") is a 2015 South Korean crime thriller film directed by Son Yong-ho.

Plot

Veteran detective Tae-soo figures out that the suspect in a hit-and-run case, Gang-chun, is a serial killer wanted for several murders. But not long after his victory, Tae-soo realizes that his younger sister Soo-kyung was Gang-chun's last victim. Gang-chun receives the death penalty, but refuses to reveal the whereabouts of the victims' bodies, leaving Tae-soo and his brother-in-law Seung-hyun devastated. Three years later, Tae-soo is investigating the murder of a gangster boss when to his surprise, he finds evidence that Seung-hyun is the prime suspect. As he digs deeper, Tae-soo learns that the gang's former boss is now in the same prison as Gang-chun, who is thriving and looking better than ever (South Korea hasn't carried out a single execution since 1997).

Cast

Kim Sang-kyung as Tae-soo
Kim Sung-kyun as Seung-hyun
Park Sung-woong as Gang-chun
Jo Jae-yoon as Kim Ki-seok
Kim Eui-sung as Son Myung-soo
Gi Ju-bong as Subsection chief Choi
Yoon Seung-ah as Soo-kyung
Oh Dae-hwan as Kal-chi
Hyun Sung as Detective Nam
Ji Sang-hyuk as Detective Shin
Choi Hyun-wook as Detective Park
Lee Da-hee as Baby's mom
Kim Young-jo as Deputy Kim
Lee Sang-in as Eun-mi
Song Young-chang as Judge (cameo)
Im Jong-yoon as Kyung-sik (cameo)

Box office
The Deal was released in South Korea on March 12, 2015. It opened at number one at the box office, grossing  from 495,000 admissions over its first four days.

References

External links

2015 films
2015 crime thriller films
2010s serial killer films
South Korean crime thriller films
South Korean serial killer films
South Korean films about revenge
2010s South Korean films
2010s Korean-language films